John W. Holter (April 1, 1916 – December 22, 2003) was a toolmaker working for the Yale and Town Lock Company Stamford Connecticut. His son Charles Holter was born on November 7, 1955 with a severe form of spina bifida. Shortly after birth he contracted meningitis, which caused his head to expand rapidly. His parents were told that he had developed "water on the brain" or hydrocephalus.

As luck would have it Holter's son was being looked after in Philadelphia, where the surgeons Nulsen and Spitz had already demonstrated that a ventricle-to-atrium diversion system could work. What they needed was an inexpensive and practical valve that could control the direction of the flow and maintain normal cranial pressure.

A chance discovery showed Holter, after a failed attempt in which a young boy died, that he could use a silicone one-way valve (pressure sealing). After a medically suitable grade of Silastic (silicone rubber) was found, the device was patented, and John Holter set up a company, Holter-Hausner International, to manufacture the cerebral shunts.

Although he was unable to save his son Casey, his design, the Spitz-Holter valve (also called the Spitz-Holter shunt) continues to help millions around the world since the late 1950s.

References

1916 births
2003 deaths
Medical technology companies of the United States
American inventors